William A. Steckel (November 12, 1921 – December 21, 2002) was a Republican member of the Pennsylvania House of Representatives.

References

Republican Party members of the Pennsylvania House of Representatives
1921 births
2002 deaths
20th-century American politicians